Homer David Cogdell (April 5, 1888 – October 8, 1956) was a college football player and US Army captain during World War I. He was also an assistant administrator in the Farmers Home Administration.

Auburn University
Cogdell was a prominent fullback and end for the Auburn Tigers football team of Alabama Polytechnic Institute from 1908 to 1911.

1909
Grantland Rice selected him All-Southern in 1909.

1910-11
He was selected All-Southern again in 1910 and 1911.

References

Auburn Tigers football players
All-Southern college football players
People from Bullock County, Alabama
Players of American football from Alabama
American football ends
American football tackles
American football fullbacks
1888 births
1956 deaths
United States Army personnel of World War I